Anthony Ross Dell (born 6 August 1945) is a former Australian cricketer who played in two Test matches in the 1970s.

Cricket career
Dell was a fast-medium seam bowler who played for Queensland and made his debut against England for the vital Seventh Test at Sydney in the 1970–71 Ashes series. With Australia needing to win he opened the bowling with Dennis Lillee and took 2–32 in the first innings – John Edrich caught by Greg Chappell for 30 and Basil d'Oliveira bowled for 1 – as England collapsed to 98–5 and 184 all out. In the second innings he was the best bowler with 3–65, but England made 302 and 223 was too much for Australia to make for victory. Dell batted last and made 3 not out in each innings and so was present at the crease when The Ashes were lost. His five wickets (19.40) put him ahead of Dennis Lillee (8 wickets at 24.87) at the top of the series averages, if you exclude Ian Chappell's one wicket for 10.00. His only other test was the First test against New Zealand at Melbourne in 1973–74 where he did not bat, but took 1–54 and 0–9 in Australia's innings victory.

Life
Anthony H Ross Dell was born on 6 Aug 1945 in New Milton, Hampshire, England. He lived for some of his childhood in Wales, where he attended Howardian High School in Penylan, Cardiff. He migrated to Australia at the age of 14 when his father was transferred to Queensland, where he attended the Anglican Church Grammar School in Brisbane.

Dell's second initial 'H' stood for the middle name "Hiroshima", although only the 'H' was recorded on his birth certificate. His parents gave him the name to commemorate the bombing of Hiroshima, which occurred on the day of his birth.  Dell officially had 'H' omitted from his name while at school. Dell's year of birth was officially listed as 1947 throughout his career and long into his retirement; he revealed in 2021 that he had lied about his age to improve his chances of selection for test matches.

Dell served in the Vietnam War as a national serviceman in the 2nd Battalion, Royal Australian Regiment from May 1967 until March 1968. He took part in several battles around the Australian base at Nui Dat.

He worked in an advertising agency in Brisbane until the 1990s, when the company collapsed.

As a result of his military service, Dell had posttraumatic stress disorder (PTSD), undiagnosed until 2008. He founded the PTSD support group Stand Tall for PTS. Stand Tall For PTS was the official charity partner of the Prime Minister's XI match at Manuka Oval on 14 January 2015 versus the English cricket team.

Dell is the subject of the biography And Bring the Darkness Home written with the journalist Greg Milam and published by Pitch Publishing in 2021.

References

External links 
 Stand Tall For PTS, the support group founded by Dell

1947 births
Living people
Australia Test cricketers
Queensland cricketers
Australian cricketers
English emigrants to Australia
People from New Milton
People educated at Anglican Church Grammar School
Australian Army soldiers
Australian military personnel of the Vietnam War
People with post-traumatic stress disorder